The 1534 capture of Baghdad by Suleiman the Magnificent of the Ottoman Empire from the Safavid dynasty under Tahmasp I was part of the Ottoman–Safavid War of 1532 to 1555, itself part of a series of Ottoman–Persian Wars. The city was taken without resistance, the Safavid government having fled and leaving the city undefended. Baghdad's capture was a significant achievement given its mastery of the Tigris and Euphrates rivers and their international and regional trade. It represented, along with the fall of Basra in 1546, a significant step towards eventual Ottoman victory and the procurement of the lower Mesopotamia, the mouths of the Euphrates and Tigris rivers, opening a trading outlet into the Persian Gulf. The Ottomans wintered there until 1535, overseeing the reconstruction of Sunni and Shia religious shrines and agricultural irrigation projects. Suleiman returned to Constantinople, leaving a strong garrison force. Over the next few decades, the Ottomans solidified their control over the region, incorporating it into their empire until it was recaptured by the Persians in 1623.

See also
 Growth of the Ottoman Empire
 Campaigns of Suleiman the Magnificent
 History of Baghdad

References

Battles involving Safavid Iran
Conflicts in 1534
Sieges involving the Ottoman Empire
Sieges of Baghdad
Capture of Baghdad
1534 in Asia
16th century in Iran
1534 in the Ottoman Empire
Ottoman history of Baghdad